The phrase "objects in (the) mirror are closer than they appear" is a safety warning that is required to be engraved on passenger side mirrors of motor vehicles in many places such as the United States, Canada, Nepal, India, and South Korea.  It is present because while these mirrors' convexity gives them a useful field of view, it also makes objects appear smaller. Since smaller-appearing objects seem further away than they actually are, a driver might make a maneuver such as a lane change assuming an adjacent vehicle is a safe distance behind, when in fact it is quite a bit closer. The warning serves as a reminder to the driver of this potential problem.

In popular culture
Despite its origin as a utilitarian safety warning, the phrase has become a well known catch phrase that has been used for many other purposes.  These include books, films (including non-English ones), cartoons, songs, music albums, and other contexts.

See also

 
 
 
 
 
 
 , another safety warning used at various London Underground stations that has also become a well-known catchphrase.

Notes

References

English phrases
Mirrors
Automotive safety
Optical illusions